The Indian general election of 1967 elected the 4th Lok Sabha of India and was held from 17 to 21 February. The 27 Indian states and union territories were represented by 520 single-member constituencies in the Lok Sabha, an increase of 26 from the previous session of Lok Sabha including two seats from Gujarat.

Elections to state assemblies were also held simultaneously, the last general election to do so. INC won 11 seats, while Swatantra Party won 12 seats out of twenty-four seats from Gujarat.

Party-wise results summary

Results- Constituency wise

References

Gujarat
Indian general elections in Gujarat
1960s in Gujarat